Liu Zhen (born 22 June 1982) is a Chinese rower who represented China at the Men's eight competition at the 2008 Summer Olympics.

References

1982 births
Living people
Rowers at the 2008 Summer Olympics
Olympic rowers of China
Rowers from Liaoning
Chinese male rowers
People from Panjin